The Weixian–Guangling–Nuanquan Campaign (蔚广暖战役) was a campaign fought in Wei (蔚) County and Warm Spring (Nuanquan 暖泉) of Chahar (province) and Guanling (广灵) of Shanxi, and it was a clash between the communists and the former nationalists turned Japanese puppet regime force who rejoined the nationalists after World War II.  The battle was one of the Chinese Civil War in the immediate post World War II era, and resulted in communist victory.  This campaign was part of the General Counteroffensive in Shanxi-Chahar (province)-Hebei.

Campaign
In September, 1945, the communist decided to take Wei (蔚) County and Warm Spring (Nuanquan 暖泉) in Chahar (province) and Guanling (广灵) in Shanxi by force after the local defenders consisted of former nationalists turned Japanese puppet regime force who rejoined the nationalists after World War II refused to surrender.  The 12th Brigade of the communist Central Hebei Column was tasked with this job, and its 34th Regiment would take Warm Spring (Nuanquan 暖泉) of Chahar (province), its 35th Regiment would take Wei (蔚) County of Chahar (province) with the help of a battalion of its 36th Regiment, and the remaining two battalions would take Guanling (广灵) of Shanxi.  At the dusk of September 29, 1945, all communist units suddenly besieged their targets and surprised the defenders.

The 34th Regiment of the 12th Brigade of the communist Central Hebei Column launched its assault against its target at dusk and annihilated most of the defenders in the fierce street fights.  The surviving defenders were annihilated in the ambush as they attempted to escape.  On September 30, 1945, the 36th Regiment of the 12th Brigade of the communist Central Hebei Column took the important position of Four Passes (Siguan, 四关) of Guanling (广灵) in Shanxi, but their subsequent attacks on the town itself via ladders were beaten back by the defenders on October 6, 1945.  The communists changed their tactic by digging tunnels and the 34th Regiment of the 12th Brigade of the communist Central Hebei Column was redeployed to reinforce their comrades on October 26, 1945.  At 10:00 PM on October 26, 1945, the general assault on the town begun and after three hours of fierce fight, the entire garrison of defenders was completely annihilated.

Meanwhile, the attack on Wei (蔚) County in Chahar (province) by the 35th Regiment of the 12th Brigade of the communist Central Hebei Column was successfully beaten back on October 1, 1945.  The 34th Regiment of the 12th Brigade of the communist Central Hebei Column was redeployed to attack Wei (蔚) County in Chahar (province) but its attack was also successfully beaten back by the defenders on October 6, 1945.  Communists responded by adding an artillery company to the attacking force and on November 2, 1945, they finally succeeded in breaching the defense at the western gate and southern gate.  After five hours of fierce street fight, the defenders were annihilated, with only around 30 were able to escape the onslaught.  The communist victory of this campaign resulted in inflicting over 3,000 casualties over their enemy, capturing more than 40 machine guns and over 1,000 firearms.

See also
List of Battles of Chinese Civil War
National Revolutionary Army
History of the People's Liberation Army
Chinese Civil War

References
Zhu, Zongzhen and Wang, Chaoguang, Liberation War History, 1st Edition, Social Scientific Literary Publishing House in Beijing, 2000,  (set)
Zhang, Ping, History of the Liberation War, 1st Edition, Chinese Youth Publishing House in Beijing, 1987,  (pbk.)
Jie, Lifu, Records of the Liberation War: The Decisive Battle of Two Kinds of Fates, 1st Edition, Hebei People's Publishing House in Shijiazhuang, 1990,  (set)
Literary and Historical Research Committee of the Anhui Committee of the Chinese People's Political Consultative Conference, Liberation War, 1st Edition, Anhui People's Publishing House in Hefei, 1987, 
Li, Zuomin, Heroic Division and Iron Horse: Records of the Liberation War, 1st Edition, Chinese Communist Party History Publishing House in Beijing, 2004, 
Wang, Xingsheng, and Zhang, Jingshan, Chinese Liberation War, 1st Edition, People's Liberation Army Literature and Art Publishing House in Beijing, 2001,  (set)
Huang, Youlan, History of the Chinese People's Liberation War, 1st Edition, Archives Publishing House in Beijing, 1992, 
Liu Wusheng, From Yan'an to Beijing: A Collection of Military Records and Research Publications of Important Campaigns in the Liberation War, 1st Edition, Central Literary Publishing House in Beijing, 1993, 
Tang, Yilu and Bi, Jianzhong, History of Chinese People's Liberation Army in Chinese Liberation War, 1st Edition, Military Scientific Publishing House in Beijing, 1993 – 1997,  (Volum 1), 7800219615 (Volum 2), 7800219631 (Volum 3), 7801370937 (Volum 4), and 7801370953 (Volum 5)

Conflicts in 1945
Campaigns of the Chinese Civil War
1945 in China
Military history of Shanxi
History of Inner Mongolia